Etelka Kenéz Heka (born 26 October 1936), sometimes Etelka Heka is a Hungarian writer, poet and singer.

Life

She was born on 26 October 1936 in Gajić, Yugoslavia but she was raised at Zmajevac. She graduated from the secondary grammar School at Bački Monoštor. She took a degree at the Teachers' Training Faculty in Hungarian in Subotica, University of Novi Sad. After her graduation she started to learn to sing from opera singer Margit Markovics privately.
She played at Novi Sad Theatre and sang at Radio Television of Vojvodina. She also sang in Vienna in 1966, then in West Germany and Denmark. Although she is a Hungarianwoman, she visited Hungary for the first time in 1974, and she met her husband, opera singer Ernő Kenéz in Budapest. They moved to Vienna where they married and they had a restaurant. In 1997 they came to Hungary when her husband became deathly ill and her spouse died at his birth town, Hódmezővásárhely in 1998.

She has three citizenships: Hungarian, Austrian and Croatian and she has got houses also in Vienna and Szeged but she lives in Hódmezővásárhely. She wrote about 90 books.

Selected books 
Séta a múltban, Bába Kiadó, Szeged, 2003.
 A lélek rejtelmei, Hódmezővásárhely, 2004.
Régi idők dalai versben, Hódmezővásárhely, 2005.
 A kozmosz titkai, hermetikus filozófia és vegyes költemények, Hódmezővásárhely, 2005.
Kenéz Heka Etelka novellái, Hódmezővásárhely, 2006.
 Laura különös históriája, Hódmezővásárhely, 2007.
 Trubadúr spirituálék, Hódmezővásárhely, 2007.
Őszi szerelem: lírikus költemények, Hódmezővásárhely, 2007.
Istar, a szerelem úrnője: válogatott költemények 50 kötetből, Antológia Kiadó, Lakitelek, 2008.
Kína varázsa: kínai versek, Hódmezővásárhely, 2008.
Vásárhelyi regős tanyák, Hódmezővásárhely, 2009.
Varázslatos Adria, Hódmezővásárhely, 2009.
A teremtés költészete szanszkrit stílusban, Hódmezővásárhely, 2009.
Istennel levelezem: szakrális ódák, költemények, Hódmezővásárhely, 2010.
A szellem bűvöletében, Hódmezővásárhely, 2015.
1050 karácsonyi haiku ének, Hódmezővásárhely, 2015.

Awards 
Hódmezővásárhely Signum Urbis Honorantis Award – 2003
Hódmezővásárhely Pro Urbe Award – 2015

References

External links 

1936 births
Living people
Hungarian women poets
20th-century Hungarian women  singers
People from Hódmezővásárhely
20th-century Hungarian poets
20th-century Hungarian women writers